Keith R. Gilges became the American Chargé d’Affaires, a.i. to Belize on July 24, 2018, replacing Adrienne Galanek, after being the Director for North America overseeing interagency policy development involving Canada and Mexico for the National Security Council at the White House. He was replaced by Leyla Moses-Ones in August 2021.

Gilges earned a Master of Science in Environmental Management from the University of Hong Kong and a Bachelor of Arts from the College of William and Mary.

References

Year of birth missing (living people)
Living people
21st-century American diplomats
Ambassadors of the United States to Belize
College of William & Mary alumni
United States National Security Council staffers
Alumni of the University of Hong Kong